Bediha Tunadağı (born 20 August 1985 in Gaziantep, Turkey) is a Turkish weightlifter competing in the – 58 kg division.

Career

As of July 2012, her best accomplishment at international level is a fourth place achieved at the 2011 European Weightlifting Championships in Kazan, Russia.

Tunadağı qualified to participate at the 2012 Summer Olympics.

Achievements

References

1985 births
Living people
Sportspeople from Gaziantep
Turkish female weightlifters
Olympic weightlifters of Turkey
Weightlifters at the 2012 Summer Olympics
20th-century Turkish sportswomen
21st-century Turkish sportswomen